Jean-Pierre François (born on 7 June 1965) is a French singer and former footballer. He remained particularly known for his 1989 summer hit "Je te survivrai", a love song written by Didier Barbelivien, which reached number 2 on the French Singles Chart.

Career
François began his football career with CS Blénod et Pont-à-Mousson. He played for Dijon from 1983 to 1986. Following a short spell with FC Basel in Switzerland he returned to France to play for AS Saint-Étienne in the 1987–88 season.

In 1989, François began a singing career with his smash hit "Je te survivrai", then with "Il a neigé sur lacs" and "Des Nuits", released in early 1990. The same year, he also released his first and sole album entitled Des Nuits, which contains a duet with Debbie Davis, but it was not successful. He decided to leave the show-biz, and became owner of a discothèque in Saint-Cyprien.

In 2004, his daughter Sandy, participated in the French TV reality show Star Academy 4.

Discography

Albums
 1990: Des Nuits
 "1ère Main"
 "Des Nuits"
 "Il a neigé sur les lacs"
 "Je l'ai revue hier soir"
 "Je te survivrai"
 "La Gamine"
 "L'amour sans rien dire"
 "Peut-être toi, peut-être un autre"
 "Y'a des heures" by Jean-Pierre François and Debbie Davis

Singles
 1989: "Je te survivrai" – #2 in France
 1990: "Il a neigé sur les lacs" – #6 in France
 1990: "Des Nuits" – #38 in France
 1990: "La Gamine"

References

Living people
1965 births
French male singers
Association football forwards
French footballers
AS Saint-Étienne players
Dijon FCO players
FC Basel players